Yordan Yosifov (12 August 1932 – 23 December 2014) was a Bulgarian footballer, who played at both professional and international levels, as a goalkeeper. He competed in the men's tournament at the 1956 Summer Olympics.

Honours

Club
Slavia Sofia
Bulgarian Cup: 1952

International
Bulgaria
Olympic Bronze Medal: 1956

References

External links

1931 births
2014 deaths
Bulgarian footballers
Bulgaria international footballers
PFC Slavia Sofia players
First Professional Football League (Bulgaria) players
Olympic footballers of Bulgaria
Footballers at the 1956 Summer Olympics
Olympic bronze medalists for Bulgaria
Olympic medalists in football
Medalists at the 1956 Summer Olympics
Association football goalkeepers